Crinagoras of Mytilene, also known as Crinogoras, sometimes spelt as Krinagorasis or Krinagoras (name in Greek: Κριναγόρας ὁ Μυτιληναῖος, 70 BC-18) was a Greek epigrammatist and ambassador, who lived in Rome as a court poet.

Early life

Crinagoras came from an eminent family from the Greek Island of Mytilene. Crinagoras was born and raised in the capital, which was the same name as the island. He had at least one known brother called Eucleides.

Rome

He was a contemporary of the Greek Geographer Strabo and Strabo mentions Crinagoras as a man of some distinction. According to inscriptions found in Mytilene, Crinagoras was sent as an ambassador on behalf of the capital to Rome in 45 BC and 26 BC.

In the reign of the first Roman Emperor Augustus, he lived in the court as a poet. During his time in Rome, he wrote several epigrams, which refer to Augustus’ reign. He also wrote poems dedicated to the Roman Gods. Crinagoras, in his work, is perceived to have a true poetic spirit.

Works
Crinagoras was the author of fifty-one epigrams, which are in the Greek Anthology. In these epigrams, Crinagoras blames himself for the hanging of wealthy patrons and several epigrams are small presents to children of his Roman noble friends. He sent an epigram addressed to Augustus’ nephew Marcus Claudius Marcellus, which with the epigram had a copy of the poems written by Greek poet Callimachus and later Crinagoras had sent Marcellus another epigram on his return from the war with the Cantabri. Other epigrams that Crinagoras has sent to was prince and future emperor Tiberius, congratulating him on his military victories in Armenia and Germany and to Augustus’ niece Antonia Minor. In other epigram, Crinagoras speaks of a sea voyage that he undertook from Asia to Italy, visiting Cyclades and Corfu on the way.

However, the most well known epigram that Crinagoras wrote was the epigram (below), that is considered to the eulogy of Ptolemaic Greek Princess and Roman Client Queen of Mauretania, Cleopatra Selene II:

The moon herself grew dark, rising at sunset,
Covering her suffering in the night,
Because she saw her beautiful namesake, Selene,
Breathless, descending to Hades,
With her she had had the beauty of her light in common,
And mingled her own darkness with her death.

Crinagoras had written the above epigram, assuming that an eclipse had occurred at the time of Selene’s death at sunset. However, there is a possibility, that Crinagoras was using a simple poetic metaphor for her death playing on a lunar aspect of Selene’s name. It is also possible that the epigram 
was written during his first visit to Rome in 45 establishing his reputation. If this were the case it would then 
refer to a different Selene, namely Cleopatra II Selene.

References

Citations

Sources

Further reading

External links
 Crinagoras: translation of all surviving epigrams at attalus.org; adapted from W.R.Paton (1916–18)

70 BC births
18 deaths
Ancient Mytileneans
Poets from ancient Lesbos
Epigrammatists of the Greek Anthology
Ancient Greeks in Rome
Ambassadors in Greek Antiquity
1st-century BC Greek people
1st-century Greek people
1st-century BC poets